Donald MacLeod is a Canadian former ice hockey defenseman who was an All-American for Boston University.

Career
MacLeod began attending Boston University in 1954. He joined the varsity ice hockey and baseball squads in his sophomore season and proceeded to win virtually every team award over the course of a three-year period. As a pitcher he had a 17–6 career record for the Terriers while he helped rebuild the ice hockey team into a powerhouse by 1958. He was named team MVP of both squads as a senior and was named as an AHCA East All-American the same year.

After graduating MacLeod pursued a professional baseball career, playing in the Milwaukee Braves's farm system for four years. In 1962 he became a teacher-coach for Acton-Boxborough High School in both ice hockey and baseball and served in that capacity for five years before becoming the assistant principal.

MacLeod was inducted into the Boston University Athletic Hall of Fame for both ice hockey and baseball.

Statistics

Regular season and playoffs

Awards and honors

References

External links

AHCA Division I men's ice hockey All-Americans
Baseball people from Prince Edward Island
Boston University Terriers men's ice hockey players
Boston University Terriers baseball players
Canadian baseball players
Canadian ice hockey defencemen
Ice hockey people from Prince Edward Island
Possibly living people
Year of birth missing